Sanfona is an album by Brazilian composer, guitarist and pianist Egberto Gismonti recorded in 1980 and 1981 and released on the ECM label. The double album features one disc of studio material with Gismonti's Academia de Dancas quartet and one disc of solo material recorded live.

Reception 
The Allmusic review by Stephen Cook awarded the album 4 stars, stating, "With fine notes and spoken bits by Gismonti, listeners will find much in the way of Brazilian musical and cultural history to complement the music. A perfect overview for the curious fan".

Track listing 
All compositions by Egberto Gismonti except as indicated
Disc One:
 "Maracatu" - 8:24 
 "10 Anos" - 7:33 
 "Frevo" - 8:11 
 "Lôro" - 5:34 
 "Em Família/Sanfona/Dança Dos Pés/Eterna" - 21:10 
Disc Two
 "De Repente" - 16:07 
 "Vale Do Eco" - 7:46 
 "Cavaquinho" - 7:59 
 "12 de Fevereiro" - 8:09 
 "Carta de Amor" - 5:06 
Disc One recorded at Talent Studio in Oslo, Norway in November 1980. Disc Two recorded at the America Haus in München, West Germany in April 1981.

Personnel
 Egberto Gismonti - 10 string guitar, super 8 guitar, Indian organ, piano, voice
Mauro Senise - soprano saxophone, alto saxophone, flute (Disc One)
Zeca Assumpção - bass (Disc One)
Nene - drums, percussion (Disc One)

References

1981 albums
ECM Records albums
Albums produced by Manfred Eicher
Egberto Gismonti albums